Kenton Terry Richardson (born 26 June 1999) is an English professional footballer who plays as a defender for National League side Gateshead.

Playing career
Richardson came through the youth team at Hartlepool United. He made his senior debut for Hartlepool as a substitute for Liam Donnelly in a 4–0 defeat to Mansfield Town on 11 February 2017. Richardson signed his first professional contract in March 2017 alongside three other Hartlepool players.

Following the expiration of his contract with Hartlepool, Richardson joined League One side Sunderland on a two-year deal, initially joining the club's under-23 side.

On 8 March 2021, Richardson joined National League side Notts County on loan until 5 April 2021. However, an injury meant that Richardson only played one game for County.

Richardson made his Sunderland debut on 5 October 2021 in an EFL Trophy win against Lincoln City.

Richardson joined National League North side Spennymoor Town on a 28 day loan deal on 12 November 2021. The loan deal was later extended until the end of the season.

After Sunderland's promotion to the Championship, it was announced in May 2022 that Richardson was one of 16 players released by the club. He made three appearances in total for the Black Cats – all in the EFL Trophy.

On 9 June 2022, Richardson signed for National League side Gateshead on a one-year deal.

International career
In March 2023, Richardson received his first call up for the England C team for their game against Wales C.

Personal life
Kenton's grandfather Fred Richardson was a professional footballer who played for Chelsea, Hartlepool United, Barnsley, Chester and West Brom. Richardson is a boyhood Sunderland fan.

Career statistics

References

External links

Association football defenders
English footballers
Footballers from County Durham
Sportspeople from Durham, England
Hartlepool United F.C. players
English Football League players
1999 births
Living people
National League (English football) players
Sunderland A.F.C. players
Notts County F.C. players
Spennymoor Town F.C. players
Gateshead F.C. players